Cyperus mangorensis is a species of sedge that is endemic to Madagascar.

The species was first formally described by the botanist Henri Chermezon in 1920.

See also
 List of Cyperus species

References

mangorensis
Taxa named by Henri Chermezon
Plants described in 1920
Endemic flora of Madagascar